Almourada Stadium is the home stadium of Almourada. The stadium is made up of mud and water. It is one of the oldest stadiums in Sudan.

Sports venues in Sudan